The Straume Nature Reserve is located in the municipality of Bø in Nordland county, Norway. 

The nature reserve lies south of Straume on the west side of Langøya. It includes two lakes—Førevatnet and Saltvatnet—and a shallow inlet called Skjørisen. The area is protected to preserve the central parts of an important wetland area with natural vegetation and wildlife, and especially a rich and specialized bird population. The nature reserve was established on December 19, 1997. Norwegian County Road 820 passes between the two halves of the nature reserve.

References

External links
 Forvaltningsplan. Straume naturreservat, Bø kommune. 2014. Bodø: Fylkesmannen i Nordland. Management plan for the nature reserve.
 Miljøverndepartementet. 1997. Straume naturreservat, Bø kommune, Nordland. 1:5,000 map of the nature reserve.

Nature reserves in Norway
Protected areas of Nordland
Bø, Nordland
Protected areas established in 1997